Perak Island is a small rocky island which constitutes the westernmost extremity of Malaysian territory. The island is a sandstone rock that rises from the Strait of Malacca.

Perak Island is part of the Malaysian state of Kedah and is expected to be designated as a marine protected area.

In March 2014, Malaysia Airlines Flight 370 disappeared off the Malaysian radar near the island.

References

Islands of Kedah
Islands of the Strait of Malacca